Lavender is a surname of French origin. People with the surname include:

 Abraham Lavender (1940–2022), American sociologist
 Brian Lavender (born 1947), Canadian ice hockey player
 Catherine Hardy Lavender (born 1930), American athlete
 Daniela Lavender (born 1975), Brazilian actress
 David Lavender (1910–2003), American historian and writer
 George Lavender (born 1955), American politician
 Ian Lavender (born 1946), English stage, film and television actor
 Jantel Lavender (born 1988), American basketball player
 Jimmy Lavender (1884–1960), American baseball player
 Jody Lavender (born 1979), American racing driver
 Joe Lavender (born 1949), American football player
 Larry Lavender (fl. 2000s–2010s), American dancer and dance scholar
 Maggie Lavender (fl. 1990s–2010s), Scottish continuity announcer
 Mark Lavender (born 1967), Australian cricketer
 Robert E. Lavender (1926–2020), American state supreme court judge
 Tina Lavender (born 1965/66), British midwife and professor of midwifery

French-language surnames